Pearl as a Detective is a 1913 silent short film comedy directed by Phillips Smalley and starring Pearl White. It was released as a split-reel with Oh, Whiskers!. It's preserved in the Library of Congress collection.

Cast
Pearl White - Pearl
Chester Barnett - Chester
Grace Darling - Grace

References

External links
 Pearl as a Detective at IMDb.com

1913 films
American silent short films
1913 short films
Universal Pictures short films
Silent American comedy films
1913 comedy films
American black-and-white films
1910s American films